D-beta-hydroxybutyrate dehydrogenase, mitochondrial is an enzyme that in humans is encoded by the BDH1 gene.

This gene encodes a member of the short-chain dehydrogenase/reductase gene family. The encoded protein forms a homotetrameric lipid-requiring enzyme of the mitochondrial membrane and has a specific requirement for phosphatidylcholine for optimal enzymatic activity. The encoded protein catalyzes the interconversion of acetoacetate and (R)-3-hydroxybutyrate, the two major ketone bodies produced during fatty acid catabolism. Alternatively spliced transcript variants encoding the same protein have been described.

See also
 3-hydroxybutyrate dehydrogenase

References

External links

Further reading